Sherman Leland (March 29, 1783 – November 19, 1853) was a Massachusetts lawyer who served in the Massachusetts House of Representatives, and as a member, and President of, the Massachusetts Senate.  During the War of 1812, he served in a regiment of U.S. Volunteers, and subsequently the 34th U.S. Infantry, at Eastport, Maine.

References
 Leland, Sherman: "The Leland Magazine, Or, a Genealogical Record of Henry Leland, and His Descendants, Containing an Account of One Thousand Six Hundred and Twenty-Four Persons In Ten Generations, and Embracing Nearly Every Person of the Name of Leland in America, from 1653 to 1850", Boston, Massachusetts: Wier & White, pp. 130–132 (1850).
 Smith, Joshua M. Borderland Smuggling: Patriots, Loyalists and Illicit Trade in the Northeast, 1783–1820. Gainesville: University Press of Florida, 2006.

Notes

Massachusetts lawyers
Massachusetts state senators
Presidents of the Massachusetts Senate
Members of the Massachusetts House of Representatives
People from Grafton, Massachusetts
People from Norfolk County, Massachusetts
1783 births
1853 deaths
19th-century American politicians
19th-century American lawyers